Ardress (formerly Ardreske) is a hamlet and townland between Loughgall and Annaghmore in County Armagh, Northern Ireland. It is made up of Ardress East and Ardress West. It is within the civil parish of Loughgall and barony of Oneilland West. It had a population of 90 people (39 households) in the 2011 Census.

See also
List of townlands in County Armagh

References 

Townlands of County Armagh